Elections to Carrickfergus Borough Council were held on 15 May 1985 on the same day as the other Northern Irish local government elections. The election used three district electoral areas to elect a total of 15 councillors.

Election results

Note: "Votes" are the first preference votes.

Districts summary

|- class="unsortable" align="centre"
!rowspan=2 align="left"|Ward
! % 
!Cllrs
! % 
!Cllrs
! %
!Cllrs
! %
!Cllrs
! %
!Cllrs
!rowspan=2|TotalCllrs
|- class="unsortable" align="center"
!colspan=2 bgcolor="" | UUP
!colspan=2 bgcolor="" | DUP
!colspan=2 bgcolor="" | Alliance
!colspan=2 bgcolor="" | PUP
!colspan=2 bgcolor="white"| Others
|-
|align="left"|Carrick Castle
|29.3
|2
|29.6
|1
|bgcolor="#F6CB2F"|31.7
|bgcolor="#F6CB2F"|1
|9.4
|1
|0.0
|0
|5
|-
|align="left"|Kilroot
|bgcolor="40BFF5"|43.6
|bgcolor="40BFF5"|3
|25.9
|1
|22.0
|1
|0.0
|0
|8.5
|0
|5
|-
|align="left"|Knockagh Monument
|bgcolor="40BFF5"|27.5
|bgcolor="40BFF5"|2
|25.8
|1
|21.4
|1
|0.0
|0
|25.3
|1
|5
|-
|- class="unsortable" class="sortbottom" style="background:#C9C9C9"
|align="left"| Total
|33.7
|7
|27.0
|3
|24.9
|3
|3.0
|1
|11.4
|1
|15
|-
|}

District results

Carrick Castle

1985: 2 x UUP, 1 x Alliance, 1 x DUP, 1 x PUP

Kilroot

1985: 3 x UUP, 1 x Alliance, 1 x DUP

Knockagh Monument

1985: 2 x UUP, 1 x Alliance, 1 x DUP, 1 x Independent Unionist

References

Carrickfergus Borough Council elections
Carrickfergus